Licuala dasyantha is a species of palm tree in the family Arecaceae.

Distribution
Licuala dasyantha is found only in and endemic to China.  Its natural habitat is subtropical or tropical moist lowland forests.

It is a Vulnerable species threatened by habitat loss.

References

dasyantha
Flora of China
Vulnerable plants
Taxonomy articles created by Polbot